Seven ships of the Royal Navy have borne the name HMS Termagant, after Termagant, a god that Medieval Europeans believed Muslims worshipped, and that later came to be popularised by Shakespeare to mean a bullying person:

  was a 26-gun sixth rate launched in 1780, reduced to an 18-gun sloop in 1782, and sold in 1795.
  was an 18-gun sloop launched in 1796 and sold in 1819.
  was a 28-gun sixth rate launched in 1822. She was renamed  in 1824. when she became a survey ship. She was sold in 1862.
She was launched in 1838, and sold in 1845.
  was a wooden screw frigate, launched in 1847 and sold in 1867.
She was sold in 1921 and broken up in 1923.
  was a  launched in 1943. She was converted to a Type 16 frigate between 1952 and 1953, and was broken up in 1965.

References

Royal Navy ship names